The 2000 Vuelta a Murcia was the 16th professional edition of the Vuelta a Murcia cycle race and was held on 1 March 2000. The race started and finished in Murcia. The race was won by David Cañada.

General classification

References

2000
2000 in road cycling
2000 in Spanish sport